Rabbi Ben Zion Halberstam (1874–1941) was the second Bobover Rebbe. He was murdered by the Nazis in 1941.

Biography
Halberstam was born in Bikofsk in 1874. His father was Shlomo Halberstam (1847–1905), the first Rebbe of Bobov, and a scion of the Divrei Chaim of Sanz. Upon his father's death Halberstam succeeded him as Rebbe. He authored a commentary on the Torah called Kedushas Tzion.

Lvov, where Halberstam then lived, fell under Nazi control in July, 1941. For about a month Halberstam hid in a room whose door was secretly blocked by a large bookcase. But a friend convinced him to come out of hiding, on the theory that the Germans were harsher to people who were found hiding. The friend also argued that the Germans would honor Halberstam’s official papers that declared he was a foreign resident. On Friday, July 25, he left his place of hiding and established himself openly in a separate room in the apartment.

Early in the morning of July 25, groups of peasants from nearby villages began to flow into Lvov. They assembled on the premises of police stations; set out from there to the streets accompanied by Ukrainian policemen, and assaulted any Jew whom they encountered with clubs, knives and axes. Groups of Jews were taken to the Jewish cemetery and murdered brutally. A roundup of Jews from their homes, coupled with looting, began in the afternoon. The proportion of Jewish intellectuals was high. Ukrainian police circulated in groups of five and consulted prepared lists. The pogrom was known as the "Petliura Days" in commemoration of Symon Petliura. For three days, Ukrainian mobs went on a rampage through the Jewish districts of Lvov. They took groups of Jews to the Jewish cemetery and to Lunecki prison and shot them.

At about 6 p.m. that very day the door opened suddenly and a Ukrainian youth entered together with the building’s gentile superintendent. The youth carried a red whip with the insignia of the Symon Petliura bands. The youth ordered Halberstam to accompany him. His youngest son, Moshe Aaron, pleaded to come along to help his father, and was eventually allowed too.

They were joined on the street corner by other distinguished prisoners from other areas in the city. Soldiers stood guard to prevent escape. When the number of captives reached a hundred, the guards arranged them in a row, three abreast, and ordered them to march. Halberstam was too weak to keep up with the rapid pace and moved to the back. The guards beat him with their batons and demanded that he hurry up. An eye-witness writes that "he saw from his window how the Rebbe, dressed in his Sabbath clothing was attacked by the soldiers. The cruel Ukrainians beat him on his head with their rifle-butts and his yarmulke fell to the ground. From time to time the Rebbe bent over and stooped to pick it up, and they beat him even more." (Eilah Azkerah by Naftoli Eherenberg, v. 1, ed., page 141)

The next day there was another action. The captives this time included three of Halberstam's sons-in-law: Rabbi Yecheskel Halberstam (son of Rabbi Yeshayale Tchechoiver), Rabbi Moshe Stempel, and Rabbi Shlome Rubin. On Monday July 28, the Jewish captives were shot in the Yanover forest behind the city. Twenty thousand Jews were shot that day; Halberstam, his son and his three sons-in-law included.

He was succeeded by his son Rabbi Shlomo Halberstam (1907–2000), who rebuilt Bobov in the United States.

Rebbes of Bobov
 Shlomo Halberstam (1847–1905) grandson of the Sanzer Rebbe, Chaim Halberstam
 Ben Zion Halberstam (1874–1941)
 Shlomo Halberstam (1907–2000)
 Naftali Halberstam (1931–2005)
 Ben Zion Aryeh Leibish Halberstam (b.1955), current Rebbe, younger son of Shlomo Halberstam

See also
Bobowa (in Poland)
Borough Park, Brooklyn

References
Nor The Moon By Night .

1874 births
1941 deaths
Rebbes of Bobov
Jews from Galicia (Eastern Europe)
Polish Hasidic rabbis
Hasidic rabbis in Europe
People murdered in Poland
Deaths by firearm in Poland
Descendants of the Baal Shem Tov